Cattleya bicalhoi, commonly known as Laelia dayana, is a species of orchid endemic to Brazil, from southern Minas Gerais to Rio de Janeiro.

Both Kew and the Royal Horticultural Society recognize this taxon as Cattleya bicalhoi Van den Berg Neodiversity 3 (4) 2008

References

External links

bicalhoi
Endemic orchids of Brazil
Orchids of Minas Gerais
Orchids of Rio de Janeiro (state)